Novy Yanzigit (Yañı Yänyeget) is a rural locality (a village) and the administrative centre of Novoyanzigitovsky Selsoviet, Krasnokamsky District, Bashkortostan, Russia. The population was 316 as of 2010. There are 6 streets.

Geography 
Novy Yanzigit is located 41 km south of Nikolo-Beryozovka (the district's administrative centre) by road. Yanaul is the nearest rural locality.

References 

Rural localities in Krasnokamsky District